Kendall County is a county located on the Edwards Plateau in the U.S. state of Texas. In 2020 census, its population was 44,279. Its county seat is Boerne. The county is named for George Wilkins Kendall, a journalist and Mexican–American War correspondent.

Kendall County is part of the San Antonio–New Braunfels, TX metropolitan statistical area.

Progressive Farmer rated Kendall County fifth in its list of the "Best Places to Live in Rural America" in 2006.

Kendall, along with Hays and Comal Counties, was listed in 2017 of the nation's 10 fastest-growing large counties with a population of at least 10,000. From 2015 to 2016, Kendall County, the second-fastest-growing county in the nation, grew by 5.16%, gaining 2,088 people in a one-year period.

History

Before 1850
Early Native American inhabitants included Kiowa, Comanche, and Lipan Apache.
 In the 1700s, Lipan Apaches discovered Cascade Caverns.
 1842
April 20 – Adelsverein organized in Germany to promote emigration to Texas.
June 7 – Fisher-Miller Land Grant set aside  to settle 600 families and single men of German, Dutch, Swiss, Danish, Swedish, and Norwegian ancestry in Texas.
 1844, June 26 – Henry Francis Fisher sold his interest in the  land grant to Adelsverein.
 1845
February – Thousands of German immigrants were stranded at port of disembarkation Indianaola on Matagorda Bay. With no food or shelters, living in holes dug into the ground, an estimated 50% died from disease or starvation. The living began to walk to their destinations hundreds of miles away.
May – John O. Meusebach arrived in Galveston.
December 20 – Henry Francis Fisher and Burchard Miller sold their rights in the land grant to Adelsverein.
 1847
Meusebach–Comanche Treaty
Sisterdale was established.
 1849 Freethinkers Bettina colonists from Llano County settled Tusculum, named after Cicero’s home in ancient Rome. The initial community banned any churches from being erected. The town was later renamed Boerne, for German-Jewish political writer Ludwig Börne, who influenced Karl Marx.

1850–1899
 1850s George W. Kendall introduced sheep ranching to the county.
 1854
John O. Meusebach received an appointment as commissioner from Governor Elisha M. Pease
May 14–15, San Antonio – The Texas State Convention of Germans adopted a political, social, and religious platform, including: 1) Equal pay for equal work; 2) Direct election of the President of the United States; 3) Abolition of capital punishment; 4)  "Slavery is an evil, the abolition of which is a requirement of democratic principles.."; 5) Free schools – including universities – supported by the state, without religious influence; and 6) Total separation of church and state.
Comfort is founded by German immigrant Freethinkers and abolitionists.
 1860 Boerne Village Band was formed by Karl Dienger.
 1861 Unionists from Kerr, Gillespie, and Kendall Counties participated in the formation of the Union League, a secret organization to support President Abraham Lincoln’s policies.
 1862
Kendall County was established from Kerr and Blanco Counties, named for journalist George Wilkins Kendall. Boerne was made the county seat.
The Union League formed companies to protect the frontier against Indians and their families against local Confederate forces. Conscientious objectors to the military draft were primarily among Tejanos and Germans .
May 30 – Confederate authorities imposed martial law on Central Texas.
August 10 – The Nueces massacre occurred in Kinney County. Jacob Kuechler served as a guide for 61 conscientious objectors attempting to flee to Mexico.  Scottish-born Confederate irregular James Duff  and his Duff’s Partisan Rangers pursued and overtook  them at the Nueces River, 34 were killed, some executed after being taken prisoner. Jacob Kuechler survived the battle. The cruelty shocked the people of Gillespie County; 2,000 took to the hills to escape Duff's reign of terror.
Spring Creek Cemetery near Harper in Gillespie County has a singular grave with the names Sebird Henderson, Hiram Nelson, Gus Tegener, and Frank Scott. The inscription reads "Hanged and thrown in Spring Creek by Col. James Duff’s Confederate Regiment."
 1866 Samuel Boyd Patton was elected chief justice after his home became part of Kendall County which had been Blanco County.
 1866, August 10 – Treue der Union Monument ("Loyalty to the Union") in Comfort dedicated to the German Texans slain at the Nueces massacre. It is one of only six such sites allowed to fly the United States flag at half-mast in perpetuity.
 1870 The original Kendall County limestone courthouse was built (Italianate architecture), with  architects Philip Zoeller and J. F. Stendebach.
 1885
Austrian-born Andreas Engel founded Bergheim.
 The Sisterdale cotton gin began operations.
 1887 San Antonio and Aransas Pass Railway began a Boerne-to-San Antonio route.
 1897, May 27 – John O. Meusebach died at his farm at Loyal Valley in Mason County, and was buried in the Marschall Meusebach Cemetery at Cherry Spring.

1900–present
 1900 Kendall County had 542 farms. Stockraising was still the principal industry.
 1905 Citizens of Boerne gathered to share agricultural information, recipes, and news of events. This later became the annual Kendall County Fair.
 1913 The Kendall County Fair Association was organized and was awarded a nonprofit corporate charter from the State of Texas.
 1914 Fredericksburg and Northern Railway connected Fredericksburg with the San Antonio and Aransas Pass Railway track just east of Comfort.
 1918 A hygieostatic bat roost house was built in Comfort to attract bats to eradicate mosquitoes and reduce the spread of malaria. It was designed for former San Antonio Mayor Albert Steves Sr., by bat authority Dr. Charles A. R. Campbell.
 1930s
The Great Depression brought an increase in tenant farming.
Commercial development of Cascade Caverns began.
 World War II – American military bases in the San Antonio area provided jobs for Kendall County residents.
 1983 The Guadalupe River State Park opened to the public.
 1988 The Federal Republic of Germany recognized the Boerne Village Band for its contribution to the German heritage in Texas and America.
 1990, Earth Day – Cibolo Nature Center opened to the public.
 1991 The  Texas Legislature adopted a resolution recognizing the Boerne Village Band for "keeping alive German music as a part of our heritage."
 1998 The current Kendall County limestone, steel, and concrete courthouse was built in Boerne, across the street from the original 1870 courthouse with architect Rehler Vaughn & Koone, Inc.
 2005 Kendall County celebrated its 100th anniversary of the Kendall County Fair.  The Kendall County Fair Association continues to produce one of the few remaining entirely privately funded county fairs in Texas.
 2013 The Kendall County Fair Association, Inc. celebrated its 100th year of existence.
 2015 Kendall County declared a state of emergency from May flooding.

Geography

Major highways

  Interstate 10
  U.S. Highway 87 (Old Spanish Trail)
  U.S. Highway 87 Business (Main Street)
  U.S. Highway 87 Business (Old Spanish Trail)
  State Highway 27 (Old Spanish Trail)
  State Highway 46
  Farm To Market Road 289 (Old Spanish Trail)
  Farm to Market Road 1621
  Farm to Market Road 3351
  Ranch to Market Road 473
  Ranch to Market Road 474
  Ranch to Market Road 1376
  Ranch to Market Road 3160 (formerly part of FM 3351)

Historic highways
  Old Spanish Trail (auto trail)
 Glacier to Gulf Highway

Adjacent counties
 Gillespie County (north)
 Blanco County (northeast)
 Comal County (southeast)
 Bexar County (south)
 Bandera County (southwest)
 Kerr County (west)

Waterways
 Guadalupe River

Caves

 Cave Without a Name
 Spring Creek Cave
 Prassell Ranch Cave
 Three Whirlpool Cave
 Cascade Caverns
 Pfeiffer's Water Cave
 Alzafar Water Cave
 Reed Cave

Demographics

Note: the US Census treats Hispanic/Latino as an ethnic category. This table excludes Latinos from the racial categories and assigns them to a separate category. Hispanics/Latinos can be of any race.

As of the census of 2010,  33,410 people, 8,613 households, and 6,692 families resided in the county. The population density was 36 people per square mile (14/km2). The 9,609 housing units averaged 14 per square mile (6/km2). The racial makeup of the county was 92.86% White, 0.56% Native American, 0.35% African American, 0.23% Asian,  4.46% from other races, and 1.55% from two or more races. About 17.89% of the population was Hispanic or Latino of any race.

Of the 8,613 households, 36.30% had children under the age of 18 living with them, 67.20% were married couples living together, 7.90% had a female householder with no husband present, and 22.30% were not families. About 19.20% of all households were made up of individuals, and 8.40% had someone living alone who was 65 years of age or older. The average household size was 2.70 and the average family size was 3.09.

In the county, the population was distributed as 27.20% under the age of 18, 6.10% from 18 to 24, 26.40% from 25 to 44, 26.40% from 45 to 64, and 13.90% who were 65 years of age or older. The median age was 39 years. For every 100 females, there were 95.00 males. For every 100 females age 18 and over, there were 91.40 males.

Males had a median income of $39,697 versus $28,807 for females. The per capita income for the county was $24,619. About 7.90% of families and 10.50% of the population were below the poverty line, including 13.60% of those under age 18 and 9.40% of those age 65 or over.

Communities

Cities
 Boerne (county seat)
 Fair Oaks Ranch (partly in Bexar and Comal Counties)

Census-designated place
 Comfort

Other unincorporated communities

 Alamo Springs
 Bergheim
 Kendalia
 Kreutzberg
 Lindendale
 Nelson City
 Oberly Crossing
 Pleasant Valley
 Sisterdale
 Waring
 Walnut Grove
 Welfare

Ghost towns

 Ammans Crossing
 Bankersmith
 Benton
 Block Creek (town)
 Brownsboro
 Currey's Creek
 Hodge's Mill
 Schiller
 Wasp Creek
 Windsor

Politics
Kendall County constitutes an anomaly in Texas politics, due to it being a historically Republican county in a state that was overwhelmingly Democratic at the presidential level until the 1960s. This is largely due to the heavily German American heritage of the county and that the area Kendall County occupies was the center of Texas’ small Unionist movement during the Civil War. Most Texas Germans acquiesced to secession, but Fredericksburg and surrounds were still self-sufficient and sold surplus food to the army. No Democratic presidential nominee has carried Kendall County since Franklin D. Roosevelt won 88% of Texas’ vote and carried all 254 counties in 1932, though his performance is particularly impressive seeing as how he won the county by almost 50 points despite the county's long-standing Republican favoritism. In 1936, when Roosevelt won over 87% of Texas’ vote, Alf Landon carried Kendall County with over 62% of the vote, making Kendall County the nation's southernmost county to vote for Landon. Since then, only Lyndon Johnson in 1964 and Jimmy Carter in 1976 have managed over 30% for the Democratic Party in Kendall County.

The county is part of the 21st District in the United States House of Representatives, represented by Republican Chip Roy, the 25th district of the Texas State Senate, represented by Republican Donna Campbell, and the 19th District of the Texas House of Representatives and is represented by Republican Ellen Troxclair.

Education
School districts include:
 Blanco Independent School District
 Boerne Independent School District
 Comal Independent School District
 Comfort Independent School District
 Fredericksburg Independent School District

All of the county is in the service area of Alamo Community College District.

Government offices

State parks

 Boerne-Hallie Maude Neff State Park (former)
 Guadalupe River State Park (part)
 Old Tunnel State Park

Fire departments
 Alamo Springs Volunteer Fire Department
 Berghiem Volunteer Fire Department
 Boerne Fire Department
 Comfort Fire Department
 kendalia Volunteer Fire Department
 Sisterdale Volunteer Fire Department
 Waring Voulunteer Fire Department

Post offices
 Village Post Office, Bergheim
 Boerne Carrier Annex
 Boerne Post Office
 Comfort Post Office
 Kendalia Post Office
 Waring Post Office

Former

 Welfare Post Office  (1880–1976)
 Currey's Creek Post Office (1870–1894)
 Panther Creek Post Office (Jun 1879-Aug 1879)
 Ammans Post Office (Feb 1881-Oct 1881)
 Benton Post Office (1875–1880)
 Block Creek Post Office (1884–1895)
 Curry Post Office (1894–1895)
 Guadalupe Post Office (1875–1890)
 Hastings Post Office (1890–1903)
 Hodge's Mill Post Office (1867–1870)
 Joseway Post Office (Feb 1880-Mar 1880)
 Schiller Post Office (1890–1907)
 South Grape Creek Post Office (1875–1881)
 Waringford Post Office (1888–1891)
 Windsor Post Office (1880–1888)
 Bankersmith Post Office
 Brownsboro Post Office

Darmstadt Society of Forty

Count Castell of the Adelsverein negotiated with the separate Darmstadt Society of Forty to colonize two hundred families on the Fisher–Miller Land Grant territory in Texas.  In return, they were to receive $12,000 in money, livestock, equipment and provisions for a year.  After the first year, the colonies were expected to support themselves. The colonies attempted were Castell, Leiningen, Bettina, Schoenburg and Meerholz in Llano County; Darmstädler Farm in Comal County; and Tusculum in Kendall County. Of these, only Castell survives. The colonies failed after the Adelsverein funding expired, and also due to conflict of structure and authorities. Some members moved to other Adelsverein settlements in Texas.  Others moved elsewhere, or returned to Germany.

See also

 German Texan
 Kendall County Courthouse and Jail
 List of museums in Central Texas
 National Register of Historic Places listings in Kendall County, Texas
 Recorded Texas Historic Landmarks in Kendall County

References

External links

 Official website
 
 Best Places to Live in 2006 from the Progressive Farmer website
  Kendall County Fair Association, Inc.
 Boerne Kendall County Economic Development Corporation

 
1862 establishments in Texas
Populated places established in 1862
Greater San Antonio
German-American history
Texas Hill Country